In Japan, pornography has unique characteristics that readily distinguish it from western pornography. Pornographic films are known as "adult videos" (AV) in Japan, so Japanese adult videos (JAV), referring to the Japanese pornographic film industry. Animated films are referred to as hentai in English, but in Japan the terms "adult anime" and "erotic animation" (or ero anime) are used.  In addition to pornographic videos and magazines featuring live actors, there are now categories of pornographic manga and anime (i.e., hentai), and pornographic computer games (eroge; for both PC and game consoles).

Reflecting Japan's views on sexuality and culture, Japanese pornography delves into a wide spectrum of heterosexual, homosexual, and transgender sexual acts in addition to unique fetishes and paraphilias. Starting with erotic stories and wood block prints from before the 20th century, Japanese pornography evolved into distinct subcategories. Partly under attempts to circumvent Japanese laws regarding censorship, but also to cater to particular fetishes, actors and producers often feature subject matter that in western pornography had historically been unseen or rarely depicted, and even now is less frequently featured; bukkake (group ejaculation), gokkun (consuming semen), omorashi (needing to urinate), and tentacle erotica are a few uniquely Japanese genres of erotica. Lolicon (young girls), shotacon (young boys), and their contribution to the controversy regarding the regulation of cartoon pornography depicting minors has been a major issue concerning child protection, free speech, and public morality both inside and outside Japan.

The Japanese Penal Code from the early 20th century has provisions against indecent material, so any lawfully produced pornography must censor the genitals of actors and actresses;  this type of censorship also extends to the graphics of hentai manga, video games, and anime.  Up until the mid-1990s, any depiction of pubic hair was also censored.  Anuses are only censored at contact or penetration. Breasts and nipples are not censored. Pixelization is commonly used to follow the censorship guidelines without being too obvious.

History

Before the 20th century
Shunga or pornographic wood-block pictures were printed with all imaginable situations. The actual uses of shunga in the period are still debated, but probably resembled modern uses of pornographic materials, including masturbation and shared viewing with a lover. Several notable woodblock artists to produce this and their creations were Hokusai's The Dream of the Fisherman's Wife, Lesbian and Two Lovers as well as Kitagawa Utamaro's Client Lubricating a Prostitute. One of the most well-known collection of Shunga can be seen in Kunisada's 1850 work A Bedside Guide to the Colours of Love in Spring.

After the Meiji Restoration in the second half of the 19th century, the publication of pornographic materials declined under government pressure.

In the 20th century
In the late Taishō period and early Shōwa period, an artistic movement called Eroguronansensu, literally "erotic-grotesque-nonsense", occurred influenced by decadence works of Europe. Open sexual expressions were permitted in novels and manga but a strict control was applied on photographs and films. After World War II, the law against 'obscenity', Article 175, was the only official censorship law that remained in force. During the Allied occupation of Japan, which lasted until 1952, all forms of sexually explicit material were prohibited in the country. American forces occupying Japan imposed Western ideas of morality and law. The Japanese public slowly came to adopt some of these ideas and practices. Negative ideas of pornography, which was foreign to Japanese culture, were accepted and applied to visual depictions as they were the ones most likely recognized and thereby criticized by Westerners. As a result, once the occupation forces left, the Japanese government kept the ban on sexually explicit material in place until the late 1980s; images or depictions of frontal nudity were banned, as well as pictures of pubic hair or genitals. No sex act could be depicted graphically. Sex work was outlawed in Japan in 1958.

Influenced by magazines like Playboy, pornographic magazines were printed soon after World War II. Playboys articles being about American lifestyle, women being mostly non-Asian, interviews being with people largely unknown in Japan, and fashion and sport being American spawned a fashion for a genre known as yōmono (literally "Western things").

In the early 1960s, several movie studios began producing "pink films". With censorship laws prohibiting genitals from being seen but otherwise free to express anything, these movies quickly diversified to fill all genres, including rape and bondage. Throughout the 1960s, the "pink films" were mainly produced by low-budget, independent filmmakers such as Kōji Wakamatsu. In 1971, the major studio Nikkatsu entered the pink film genre.

Starting in 1971, homosexually-oriented magazines began to appear, including Barazoku. Homosexual magazines tend to be tailored to particular segments of the population, such as Badi, which features younger adult males, Samson, devoted to chubby men, and G-men, featuring muscular men.

The 1976 Japanese love film In the Realm of the Senses by Nagisa Ōshima was banned from Japan due to its nudity and erotic content. Despite quickly becoming a sensation at film festivals in New York and Cannes, in October 1976 the film was seized by Japanese authorities. The film was based on a true story well known in Japan, its content, involving the vivid depiction of asphixiophilia, was considered too obscene for public viewing in Japan. The producer and script writer for the film were taken to court and charged with obscenity but were found not guilty. Frontal nudity was not permitted to appear on film in Japan until 1986.

1980s
The proliferation of pornographic videos in the 1980s commonly called A/V (short for adult video) sold more videos because most Japanese families now had at least two television sets and VCRs. It is rumored, but not substantiated, that VHS became popular over Betamax format because large numbers of A/V were released in VHS format. Few A/Vs were sold in laserdisc format. Playing games on personal computers with no limitation on content except for censorship laws was sometimes viewed as being synonymous with playing bishōjo games, because so few Japanese people saw any reason to play video games on these platforms, as opposed to video game consoles.

In the late 1980s, the dōjinshi market expanded. It is estimated that about half of this market consists of pornography. Copyright problems plague the market, yet the dōjinshi market was a common place for one to start before making a debut in a professional magazine. Yaoi began in the dōjinshi market.

1990s
According to John Carr, a United Kingdom government adviser on Internet safety policy for children, two-thirds of all pedophilic images on the Internet in the late 1990s may have originated in Japan. He further commented, "We think that child pornography, in any form, promotes values and sends the message that it is OK to sexually abuse children. It helps pedophiles to justify their ideas or behavior and it desensitizes society as a whole." Since the law against child pornography in 1999, the proportion is now believed to be less than 2%. ECPAT believes that many child pornography producers have simply turned to producing anime or films featuring adults dressed as children.

21st century
During the COVID-19 lockdowns, global viewership for Japanese pornography rose significantly as more people were forced to stay home. The sale of videos, sex toys, and even subtitles rose significantly in sales during this period. At the same time, the use of VR goggles has shot up during this period, mainly due to the increase in available content and faster internet speeds.

With the Japanese porn industry growing, more and more women in the country have become victims of sexual exploitation. Many were tricked into believing they were signing up for 'modelling contracts', only to be coerced into becoming pornography actresses. This continuous occurrences have led to calls for greater regulation in the industry.

In September 2022, one of the largest Japanese adult video distribution websites, R18.com, announced that they will be closing down permanently effective 1st January 2023 due to billing issues. The company's Japanese website, DMM.com, will still remain operational, although international payments have been restricted.

In June 2022, the Japanese government passed a bill that made pornography legal in the country. The new set of laws also aims to protect actors who were pressured into entering the industry, by giving them rights to prohibit the sale of videos in which they appear after five years from initial release date.  This has led to many production companies to go out of business.

Considerations

Censorship laws

Under Article 175 of the Criminal Code of Japan people who sell or distribute obscene materials can be punished by fines or imprisonment. Article 175 was included in the original document in 1907 and remains relatively unchanged. Showing pubic hair and adult genitalia was once considered obscene.

Maebari (literally "front patch") is a Japanese slang term used in the pornography industry to mean "hiding the pubic hair". Initially this was done by sticking adhesive tape over the crotch, and the term maebari was used for this tape. This technique allowed the film makers to conform with Japanese censorship requirements and avoid the risk of expensive re-shooting. In Japanese pink films these maebari evolved into self-adhesive bandage-like coverings that were discarded after use. They were often skin coloured and triangular. Once the removal of pubic hair by shaving became popular, maebari  fell out of use.

Video pornography routinely depicts explicit sex scenes with the participants' genitalia obscured by pixelization. The amount of censorship of the penis can vary. The publication of Waterfruit and Santa Fe by Kishin Shinoyama was likely the first publication that featured pubic hair. Many video production companies belong to ethical associations which provide guidance on what is acceptable and what is not. The Nihon Ethics of Video Association, the Ethics Organization of Computer Software and the Contents Soft Association are three examples of such organizations.

Religion and pornography

Japan's indigenous religion, Shinto (Kami-no-Michi), is based in animism, with a belief that supernatural beings dwell in nature. The gods and goddesses of Shinto are not repositories of morality or perfection; instead, they exist within nature and thus, sexuality is an innate part of life itself. Therefore, religious attitudes are no obstacle to the presence of pornographic material in Japan's society.

Child pornography

Possession of child pornography depicting real children is illegal in Japan since June 2014. Distribution of child pornography was made de jure illegal in 1999 after international pressure from the United Nations, UNICEF and other international organizations, although the law made a distinction between hardcore pornography and softcore pornography, which is widely available in Japan, such as at junior idol and lolicon media centers like Akihabara and Nipponbashi, and at most konbini, or Japanese convenience stores. Prosecutions have been made under the new law by prosecutors under Japan's unique legal system, resulting in some financial verdicts, with relative strictness of enforcement continuing to vary by prefecture.

In June 2008, a bill that proposed the imposition of a ban on child-pornography possession was submitted to the House of Representatives of Japan where it was brought before the Diet in September, but failed to pass. On 15 July 2014 penalties were added to the simple possession of child pornography as a result of the revision of the law.

Sexual assault 
In 1999, Milton Diamond and Ayako Uchiyama postulated that the rise of pornographic material in Japan from the 1970s onwards creates a decrease in reported violence.

In 2016, the campaign group Human Rights Now reported allegations that some women appearing in pornographic films had been forced to do so against their will. The group called for the introduction of legislation to regulate production companies and for help for any performers who had experienced abuse.

Coercion

In 2016, Japanese porn actress Saki Kozai told AFP, Tokyo that she was tricked into doing porn. She signed a deal with an agency believing she will be doing modelling. At the time of the first shoot, she was asked to take off clothes and have sex in front of camera. She was surrounded by 20 men and couldn't say 'no' and had to unwillingly do the act in front of camera. The agency also convinced her to cut off from the family to focus on work. Another woman from the porn industry said that she was tricked into porn by an agency on the pretense of becoming a singer.  

In Tokyo, three people were arrested for allegedly forcing a woman to appear in more than 100 pornographic movies. Porn agencies use intimidation tactics when women try to refuse to do the act, by demanding huge fines, citing vaguely worded contracts, telling them they won't find a job outside of the porn industry. Many such women committed suicide under high pressure and coercion they face.

Depiction of illegal activity 
Many Japanese-made pornographic films (JAV), have titles that suggest that they use minors, or that they show the recording of another actual crime. However, any and all titles that are circulated with the approval of Eirin, the Japanese film industry's regulatory body, are in full compliance with and do not break any Japanese laws.

A common ploy is to have a part of a title replaced with a character, or to use a phonetically similar neologism. For example, a video that is actually about a "19-year-old Girls Sex Party!" may be sold with a suggestive title like "1X-year-old Girls Sex Party!". The word , lit. "high school girl", cannot be used as it would suggest a girl of 17 years or younger, who cannot legally act in a pornographic video. However, the homophonic neologism , which utilizes different kanji and can mean "girl student", is considered a different word and is used in a large number of titles to promote the product without breaking censorship laws; this may be seen in popular places of Japan such as Akihabara in Tokyo or Den Den Town in Osaka.

Types

Dōjin and parodies

Dōjinshi (often transliterated as doujinshi), or self-published works that are often manga, are frequently (but not always) pornographic, either as original works or as imitations of popular anime, games and manga.

Anime

Animated erotica (known in the West as hentai but in Japan as "adult anime", "ero anime" or "erotic animation") is a popular genre in Japan and generally maintains the same style of animation seen in other popular forms of Japanese animation (anime).

Used in everyday conversation in Japanese, the default meaning of the term hentai is simply "weird" implying "perverted" (ie, implying that any amount of lewdness is "perverted", rather than making a distinction between "normal" and "perverted" erotica).

(Used as a technical term, the word hentai can also mean "metamorphosis"/"transformation", although that is more of an etymological trivia fact, rather than revealing anything about the meaning of the word as actually used in normal conversation.)

Games

Adult-oriented games are a genre for video games in Japan. Because of the language barrier and cultural differences, the genre is less popular outside Japan. Known as bishōjo games or "pretty girl games" (alternately spelled bishoujo), or as eroge in Japanese, the games are known under several names used by English fans, including PC dating-sim game, hentai game/H game, and so on. Companies such as JAST USA and MangaGamer are translating dating sims and visual novels into English for the fledgling market outside Japan. For adult video games in Japan, the rating of "18+" was coined by the Ethics Organization of Computer Software or Contents Soft Association. Rating of adult video games has not gone in Computer Entertainment Rating Organization.

The Internet
Fanfiction, commonly found in websites, is not limited to fictitious characters and often uses real live people as well, though these works would make little sense to those who do not see Japanese TV programs. Dōjinshi writers typically use the Internet to market their products by offering previews of new works, a secret address where buyers can find additional works, and a sample of their games. They also recruit new writers and artists online. Several exclusively adult oriented search engines exist to let someone find a site they are looking for, without having to search through commercial websites that list all keywords. Many works of dōjinshi are featured in websites that collect the art and let people look for free.

Many websites feature seasonal greeting pictures, often pornographic, from linked sites and friends who frequent their sites. A typical Christmas greeting picture on such sites features a Santa-girl in various stages of undressing. The twelve zodiac animals of Chinese astrology allow for variations on catgirls.

Magazines
Magazines are, along with videos, popular media for pornographic materials. Magazines that contain pornographic manga or pictures are controlled, and feature age requirements for purchase. Many localities in Japan require pornographic magazines to be sealed when sold outside of adult bookstores, but it is not uncommon to find non-pornographic magazines that feature nudity. Many magazines, especially weekly tabloids, include nude images and photo spreads similar to Page Three girls featured in many western tabloids. So long as these images do not depict sexual organs or sex acts, they are not considered pornographic and, hence, are freely sold in public.

Confessional writings by both genders are a popular topic in men's and pornographic magazines.

Movie adaptations
In August 2019, Netflix released Naked Director, an original drama depicting the life of a Japanese adult video producer, Toru Muranishi and one of his first casts, Kaoru Kuroki. The drama received worldwide recognition, with a second season released in 2021. Today, Toru Muranishi is known as the "Emperor of Porn" and "the dirtiest of the industry’s dirty old men" for being one of the pioneers in the industry.

Manga

Manga with pornographic content targets both male and female audiences, and both male and female manga artists write pornographic works. Male-oriented pornographic manga is known as eromanga. In Western contexts, this is more commonly referred to as hentai manga.

Video (JAV)
Due to the large amount of videos produced, JAV films are typically assigned a code by the studio as a unique identifier. JAV codes usually consist of letters which identify the producer or type of content, followed by a sequential number.

Virtual Reality (VR)
Virtual reality has risen in popularity in recent years, largely propelled by the porn industry. Since the start of 2020, virtual reality usage for Japanese adult videos have skyrocketed, largely attributed to the COVID-19 pandemic and the industry maturing.

Subgenres
Among the various subgenres of Japanese pornography are the following:
 Lolicon (short for "Lolita complex") : This genre involves prepubescent and adolescent girls between the ages of 6–11. It is typically animated pornography, as the legal age to be featured in a pornographic film in Japan is 18.
 Shotacon (short for "Shoutarou Complex"): Similar to Lolicon, this genre involves prepubescent or under-aged boys between the ages 6–11. It is typically animated pornography, as the legal age to be featured in a pornographic film in Japan is 18.
 Yaoi ("Boy's Love"): Featuring two boys or men in a homosexual/gay relationship. Target audience is typically young adult women. Typically features a feminine 'uke,' or submissive, and a masculine 'seme,' or dominant, but this is not always the case as 'uke' is often portrayed as masculine as well.
 Geikomi (sometimes "Bara"): Manga made by and for gay men that are often pornographic. Typically features adult men with varying degrees of muscle, body fat, and body hair, akin to beefcake or bears. Geikomi can focus on the more realistic obstacles and challenges that come with being gay in Japan.
 Yuri ("Girl's Love"): Featuring two grown adult women in a homosexual/lesbian relationship. Target audience are mostly men or lesbians, but it is much less popular than Yaoi.
 Porn for women: new subgenre targeting women, portraying "eromen" (erotic men) who are catering to women's needs.

Genres

Bukkake
Cuckold
Futanari
Gokkun
Group sex
Gang bang
Hamedori
Interracial
Japanese bondage
Gay
Lesbian
Lotion play
Sexual fetishism
Foot fetishism
Exhibitionism
Tamakeri
Voyeurism

Companies and people

Magazines

Bejean (GOT Corp.)—big seller
Weekly Playboy (Shueisha)—big seller
Urecco (Mirion Shuppan)
Video Boy (GOT Corp.)

Publishers

Core Magazine
Futabasha
Shinchosha
Wani Books
Wanimagazine

Studios

Alice Japan
Atlas21
Attackers
CineMagic Co.
Cross
Crystal-Eizou
Dogma
 Dreamroom Productions 
Glory Quest
h.m.p.
Hokuto Corporation
Hot Entertainment
IdeaPocket
Japan Home Video
KMP
Kuki Inc.
Madonna
Max-A
Million Film
Moodyz
Muteki
S1 No. 1 Style
SexiA
Soft On Demand
Total Media Agency
V&R Planning—includes V&R Products & V&R International
Wanz Factory

Personalities

Ai Iijima
Bunko Kanazawa
Chocoball Mukai
Maria Ozawa
Sora Aoi
Yua Aida
Akiho Yoshizawa

Notes

See also

 Chronology of adult videos in Japan
 Eirin
Ecchi (エッチ)
 Pornography in Europe
 Pornography in the United States
 Prostitution in Japan
Sexuality in Japan
 Sex industry
The Great Mirror of Male Love

References

Further reading
 

   The current status of live-action Japanese pornography.
  An overview of the Japanese pornographic film and video industry.

External links
 
 Anti-Pornography-&-Prostitution Research Group (APP-JP) (pro-censorship)

Japanese culture
Law of Japan
 
Society of Japan
LGBT history in Japan
Sexuality in Japan